Tek It or Leave It was a Belizean game show modeled after Deal or No Deal. The show was pre-recorded every Wednesday at 8:30 p.m. and it aired the following Tuesday at 8:00 p.m. on Channel 5. It was first recorded on November 26, 2008, and first aired on December 2, 2008. The show ran for one season over 13 weeks. It was hosted by Angela Gegg, a well known Belizean artist. The last episode aired on February 17, 2009.

Gameplay
One lucky audience member is selected and has the chance to win up to 5,000 Belize dollars (US$2,500), although on some occasions, the grandprize would be 10,000 dollars. On the season finale on February 11, 2009, it was even raised to 15,000 dollars, which was won by the player.

Box values

Regular

Special

Season finale

References

Belizean television series
Deal or No Deal
2008 Belizean television series debuts
2009 Belizean television series endings
2000s Belizean television series